Durlung may refer to:

Durlung, Bagmati
Durlung, Dhawalagiri